Earl of Cottenham, of Cottenham in the County of Cambridge, is a title in the Peerage of the United Kingdom. It was created in 1850 for the prominent lawyer and Whig politician Charles Pepys, 1st Baron Cottenham. ) He served as  Lord Chancellor from 1836 to 1841 and from 1846 to 1850. Pepys had already been created Baron Cottenham, of Cottenham in the County of Cambridge, in 1836, and was made Viscount Crowhurst, of Crowhurst in the County of Surrey, at the same time he was given the earldom. These titles are also in the Peerage of the United Kingdom. The viscountcy is used as a courtesy title for the Earl's eldest son and heir apparent.

In 1845 Lord Cottenham succeeded his elder brother as third Baronet, of Wimpole Street, and in 1849 he also succeeded his cousin as fourth Baronet, of Brook Street, according to a special remainder in the letters patent. The Baronetcy, of Wimpole Street, was created in the Baronetage of the United Kingdom in 1801 for Lord Cottenham's father William Pepys, a Master in Chancery. The Baronetcy, of Brook Street, was created in the Baronetage of Great Britain in 1784 for Lucas Pepys.   the titles are held by the first Earl's great-great-great-grandson, the ninth Earl, who succeeded his father in 2000.

The title of the earldom is derived from the village of Cottenham in Cambridgeshire, birthplace of John Pepys, ancestor of the first Earl, and great-uncle of Samuel Pepys the diarist. Another member of the Pepys family was Henry Pepys, third son of Sir William Pepys, 1st Baronet, and younger brother of the first Earl. He was Bishop of Worcester from 1841 to 1860.

The family seat is Priory Manor, near Kington St Michael, Wiltshire.

Pepys baronets, of Wimpole Street (1801)
Sir William Pepys, 1st Baronet (1740–1825)
Sir William Weller Pepys, 2nd Baronet (1778–1845)
Sir Charles Pepys, 3rd Baronet (1781–1851) (created Baron Cottenham in 1836 and Earl of Cottenham in 1850)

Earls of Cottenham (1850)
Charles Christopher Pepys, 1st Earl of Cottenham (1781–1851)
Charles Edward Pepys, 2nd Earl of Cottenham (1824–1863)
William John Pepys, 3rd Earl of Cottenham (1825–1881)
Kenelm Charles Edward Pepys, 4th Earl of Cottenham (1874–1919)
Kenelm Charles Francis Pepys, 5th Earl of Cottenham (1901–1922)
Mark Everard Pepys, 6th Earl of Cottenham (1903–1943), a racing driver 
John Digby Thomas Pepys, 7th Earl of Cottenham (1907–1968)
Kenelm Charles Everard Digby Pepys, 8th Earl of Cottenham (1948–2000), a cricketer 
Mark John Henry Pepys, 9th Earl of Cottenham (b. 1983)

Present peer
Mark John Henry Pepys, 9th Earl of Cottenham (born 11 October 1983) is the elder son of the 8th Earl of Cottenham and his wife Sarah Lombard-Hobson. He was styled as Viscount Crowhurst between 1983 and 20 October 2000, when he succeeded to the peerages and baronetcies. He has an older sister, Lady Georgina Pepys (born 1981), and a younger brother, Sam Richard Pepys (born 1986).

In 2019, the fund manager BITE Investments appointed Cottenham as its Head of Operations for China

The heir apparent is Cottenham's son Charlie Thomas Crowhurst Pepys, Viscount Crowhurst (born 2020).

Pepys baronets, of Brook Street (1784)
Sir Lucas Pepys, 1st Baronet (1742–1830)
Sir Charles Leslie, 2nd Baronet (1774–1833)
Sir Henry Leslie, 3rd Baronet (1783–1849)
Charles Pepys, 1st Baron Cottenham, 4th Baronet (1781–1851)
see Earls of Cottenham for further succession

Notes and citations
Citations

Notes

References

Kidd, Charles, Williamson, David (editors). Debrett's Peerage and Baronetage (1990 edition). New York: St Martin's Press, 1990,

External links

Earldoms in the Peerage of the United Kingdom
1784 establishments in Great Britain
1801 establishments in the United Kingdom
1850 establishments in the United Kingdom
Noble titles created in 1850
Earl of Cottenham